The Battle of Villar de los Navarros (August 24, 1837) was a battle of the First Carlist War.  It occurred near the town of Villar de los Navarros in Zaragoza Province and was a victory for the Carlists. 

The Carlists took many prisoners, including the brigadier Ramón Solano, 84 officers, 60 sergeants, and 1,500 infantrymen; 400 of whom were forced to join the Carlist army. 

1,245 prisoners, many badly wounded, were taken on the night of August 24 to the towns of Herrera de los Navarros and Villar de los Navarros.  These prisoners, called los prisioneros de Herrera, were stripped completely naked and despoiled of all of their possessions.   

On August 25, the Carlist army departed from Villar with this contingent of prisoners.  The Carlist army included the Briton adventurer C.F. Henningsen.

References 

Villar de los Navarros
Villar de los Navarros
1837 in Europe
1837 in Spain
Villar de los Navarros
August 1837 events